Guyalna is a genus of cicadas in the family Cicadidae. It was first described by Boulard and Martinelli in 1996. Members of this genus are characterized by three-segmented tarsi, a rounded timbal cover apex, a pronotum shorter than the mesonotum, the head as wide or slightly wider than the mesonotum, and slightly protruding eyes, according to the authors who first described it.

List of species 
This genus comprises 25 species.

 Guyalna atalapae Boulard & Martinelli, 2011
 Guyalna bicolor Olivier, 1790 
 Guyalna bleuzeni Boulard & Martinelli, 2011 
 Guyalna bogotana Distant, 1892 
 Guyalna bonaerensis Berg, 1879
 Guyalna brisa Walker, 1850
 Guyalna chlorogena Walker, 1850 
 Guyalna coffea Sanborn, Moore & Young, 2008
 Guyalna cuta Walker, 1850
 Guyalna densusa Boulard & Martinelli, 2011
 Guyalna distanti Goding, 1925
 Guyalna flavipronotum Sanborn, 2007
 Guyalna glauca Goding, 1925
 Guyalna jamesi Sanborn, 2016 
 Guyalna jauffreti Boulard & Martinelli, 2011 
 Guyalna maxineae Sanborn, 2016 
 Guyalna nadae Gogala, Šporar, Sanborn & Maccagnan, 2015 
 Guyalna nigra Boulard, 1999 
 Guyalna panamensis Davis, 1939
 Guyalna parvula Jacobi, 1904
 Guyalna platyrhina Sanborn & Heath, 2014
 Guyalna rufapicalis Boulard, 1998
 Guyalna sublaqueata Uhler, 1903
 Guyalna variegata Sanborn, 2005
 Guyalna viridifemur Walker, 1850

References 

Fidicinini
Cicadidae genera